The 1992–93 Tampa Bay Lightning season was the team's inaugural season in the National Hockey League (NHL). They finished sixth in the Norris Division with a record of 23 wins, 54 losses, and 7 ties for 53 points.

Offseason

Manon Rhéaume
On September 23, 1992, Manon Rhéaume became the first woman to play in an NHL exhibition game as the Tampa Bay Lightning played against the St. Louis Blues.

Regular season
The Lightning finished last in penalty-kill % during the regular season (74.43%).

In the Lightning's very first NHL game on Wednesday, October 7, 1992, Chris Kontos scored the first hat trick in Lightning history as Tampa Bay defeated the Chicago Blackhawks 7-3 (the 7 goals would be the most that the Blackhawks would allow in a regular-season game that year). On Friday, November 13, 1992, Pat Jablonski recorded the first shutout in Lightning history, as Tampa Bay blanked their fellow expansion cousins the Ottawa Senators 1-0 at home. 

Although the Lightning finished well out of playoff contention, their 53 points was by far the best inaugural season performance of any of the three expansion teams that joined in the early 1990's. Tampa Bay's 53 points was actually more than the combined totals for that season of the Senators and the San Jose Sharks (who were then in their second season), both of whom recorded only 24 points each.

Final standings

Game log

Player stats

Skaters

Goaltenders

† Denotes player spent time with another team before joining the Lightning. Stats reflect time with the Lightning only.
‡ Denotes player was traded mid-season. Stats reflect time with the Lightning only.

Note: GP = Games played; G = Goals; A = Assists; Pts = Points; +/- = plus/minus; PIM = Penalty minutes;
TOI = Time on ice; W = Wins; L = Losses; T = Ties; GA = Goals-against; GAA = Goals-against average; SO = Shutouts; SA = Shots against; SV% = Save percentage;

Transactions

Trades
Trades listed are from June 1, 1992 to June 1, 1993.

Free agents

Waivers

Draft picks

Expansion draft

Entry draft
Tampa Bay's draft picks at the 1992 NHL Entry Draft held at the Montreal Forum in Montreal, Quebec.

References
Lightning on Hockey Database

Tampa Bay Lightning seasons
Tampa Bay Lightning season, 1992-93
Tampa Bay Lightning season, 1992-93
Tamp
Tamp